Steve Weissman is an American sportscaster who joined ESPN in January 2010. He came to ESPN from Comcast Sportsnet (CSN) in California, where he served as the network's lead anchor. Before CSN, he worked at WNEM in Saginaw, Michigan, winning multiple Michigan Association of Broadcasters Awards.

Weissman also served as the sports anchor/reporter at WMTV in Madison, Wisconsin, and began his career as a sports anchor/reporter at WBKB in Alpena, Michigan. He hosted SportsCenter and other shows at ESPN from 2010 to 2015. He currently works at NFL Network and Tennis Channel.

Personal
Weissman is a D.C. native, a graduate of Springbrook High School in Silver Spring, Maryland, and the Medill School of Journalism at Northwestern University in Evanston, Illinois where he was a member of the Sigma Chi fraternity.

References

Year of birth missing (living people)
Living people
American sports journalists
American television sports announcers
Jewish American sportspeople
Olympic Games broadcasters
People from Silver Spring, Maryland
Tennis commentators
21st-century American Jews